Hugh Fleetwood (born 1944) is a British writer and painter.

Biography 
At 18 Fleetwood went to live to France, and later moved to Italy at the age of 21. He remained in Italy for the next fourteen years. Fleetwood had his first art exhibition in 1970 at the Festival dei Due Mondi in Spoleto. He published his first novel, A Painter of Flowers, in 1971, and also designed the book's jacket.

Fleetwood won the John Llewellyn Rhys Prize in 1974 for his second novel, The Girl Who Passed for Normal. His 1977 novel The Order of Death formed the basis for the screenplay of the 1983 film Copkiller, starring Harvey Keitel and John Lydon. Fleetwood adapted the book for the film with director Roberto Faenza and Ennio de Concini.

After his return to England, he had two further solo art shows. He currently lives in London.

In 2020, being unable to reach his studio to paint due to the Covid-19 pandemic, he finished work on seven novels begun in the previous years and revised two older novels. He published these nine books himself through the Amazon platform.

Bibliography

Novels 
1972 - A Painter of Flowers, Hamish Hamilton (UK)/Viking (US)
1973 - The Girl Who Passed For Normal, H.H. (UK)/Stein and Day (US)
1974 - Foreign Affairs, H.H. (UK)/Stein & Day (US)
1975 - A Conditional Sentence, H.H. (UK)/Pocket Books (US)
1976 - A Picture of Innocence, H.H. (UK)/Pocket Books (US)
1977 - The Order of Death, H.H. (UK)/Simon & Schuster (US)
1978 - An Artist and a Magician (US: Roman Magic) H.H. (UK)/Atheneum (US)
1980 - The Godmother, H.H. (UK) (Revised edition 2020)
1981 - The Redeemer, H.H. (UK)/Simon & Schust. (US)
1983 - A Young Fair God, H.H. (UK)(Revised edition 2020)
1986 - Paradise, H.H. (UK)
1987 - The Past, H.H. (UK)
1989 - The Witch, Viking (UK & US)
1991 - The Mercy Killer	, Sinclair-Stevenson Ltd (UK)
1999 - Brothers, Serpent's Tail (UK)
2006 - The Dark Paintings, Bigfib	 (UK)
2013 - Our Lady of the Flies (Revised edition 2020)
2020 - The Portrait Painter
2020 - Freedom
2020 - The Vampire of Tlallpa
2020 - The Angel of Death: The Scottish Trilogy Book One
2020 - A Great Shot: The Scottish Trilogy Book Two
2020 - Complicity: The Scottish Trilogy Book Three
2020 - The Company of Finches
2022 - " Collected poems"  Simple Edizioni, Macerata

Novellas 
2004 - L & I, Millivres (UK)
2008 - The Other Half, Arcadia (UK)

Short stories 
1979 - The Beast, H.H. (UK)/Atheneum (US)
1982 - Fictional Lives, H.H. (UK)
1984 - A Dance to the Glory of God, H.H. (UK)
1988 - Man Who Went Down with His Ship, H.H. (UK)

Travel writing 
1985 - A Dangerous Place, H.H. (UK)

Poetry 
2019 - "Sketches and Reflections", Zeus Publishing (Russia)

References

External links 
 Official site

Living people
1944 births
20th-century English novelists
21st-century English novelists
20th-century English painters
English male painters
21st-century English painters
21st-century English male artists
English male poets
English screenwriters
English male screenwriters
English short story writers
English travel writers
Book artists
John Llewellyn Rhys Prize winners
English male short story writers
English male novelists
20th-century British short story writers
21st-century British short story writers
20th-century English male writers
21st-century English male writers
English male non-fiction writers
20th-century English male artists